Ashton Township is one of twenty-two townships in Lee County, Illinois, USA.  As of the 2010 census, its population was 1,185 and it contained 520 housing units.  Ashton Township was originally formed as Ogle Township from Bradford Township on February 12, 1861; the name was changed to Ashton on November 7, 1867.

Geography

Cities, towns, villages
 Ashton

Cemeteries
The township contains Ashton Cemetery.

Airports and landing strips
 Swords Heliport

Demographics

School districts
 Ashton Community Unit School District 275

Political districts
 Illinois's 14th congressional district
 State House District 90
 State Senate District 45

References
 
 United States Census Bureau 2009 TIGER/Line Shapefiles
 United States National Atlas

External links
 City-Data.com
 Illinois State Archives
 Township Officials of Illinois

Townships in Lee County, Illinois
1867 establishments in Illinois
Townships in Illinois